First Lady of Zimbabwe is the title held by the wife of the president of Zimbabwe.

The current office holder is the wife of President Emmerson Mnangagwa, Auxillia C. Mnangagwa. Mnangagwa also held the parliamentary seat of Chirumanzu-Zibagwe until 30 July 2018  Mnangagwa did not contest her seat during the 2018 general election.

First Ladies of Zimbabwe and its antecedents

Wives of the prime minister of Southern Rhodesia

Wife of the prime minister of Rhodesia

First Lady of Zimbabwe Rhodesia

First Ladies of Zimbabwe

See also
 President of Zimbabwe
 President of Rhodesia
 Auxillia Mnangagwa
 Grace Mugabe
 Sally Hayfron
 Janet Banana
 Chirumanzu-Zibagwe (Constituency)

References

Zimbabwe
Politics of Zimbabwe
Presidents of Zimbabwe